Canford Heath is a suburb and area of heathland in Poole, Dorset, known for being the largest heathland in Dorset, and the largest lowland heath in the UK. It is also the name of the housing development built on the heathland in the 1960s, 1970s and 1980s. The area is split into two wards, and at the 2011 census the combined population of the two wards was 14,079.

History 
Historically, Canford Heath was part of the Canford Estate; in the Domesday Book, the manor of Cheneford was held by Edward of Salisbury. Canford Heath was common land. In 1810, it was subdivided among Poole's Proprietors, in response to the 1805 Enclosure Act, which "enabled the enclosure of over 9000 acres of ‘Common Meadows, Heaths, Waste Lands and Commonable Grounds’".

In the early 20th century, Canford Heath had many different uses. In 1929, a hillclimb event for the "Motorcycle and Light Car Club" was staged here, and during the Second World War, the heath was used as a munitions storage. In 1938, most of the heath burned in a series of large fires.

In 1944, it was suggested that Canford Heath should be "preserved from business development" after the War, although in 1946, a plan was issued by Professor Abercrombie that suggested the use of Canford Heath as a housing development, in preference to building in the New Forest. In 1947, there was another large heath fire.

Building work began on a housing development in 1963 in South Canford Heath, whilst Parkstone and Poole grammar schools were relocated to the edge of the heath in 1962 and 1968 respectively, and the first combined school opened in Canford Heath in 1970. The first supermarket on the Heath was Waitrose, which opened in June 1970 sharing its car park with the also recently opened Fighter Pilot (now The Pilot) public house and Canford Heath United Reformed Church. Waitrose closed in 1982 to be replaced by Kwik Save. The current supermarket at Adastral Square is Iceland.
Housing development began in 1973 in North Canford Heath, and in 1980, International Supermarket and formerly Somerfield (now Asda) became North Canford Heath's first supermarket.

In 1984, planning permission was given for development of all of Canford Heath, providing that the site did not become a Site of Special Scientific Interest (SSSI). In response, an application was made in 1985 for much of Canford Heath to become a SSSI, due to the rare habitat and wildlife on the heathland. The application was accepted in 1988, although developers were still permitted to build houses on land not in the SSSI. A report by the Conservation Committee of the British Herpetological Society to the House of Lords in 1988 said that "more than half of Canford, our largest single heath, is being built over with most of its reptiles doomed or already lost", and a 1988 New Scientist article claimed that the SSSI boundary had been drawn around planning permission on the heath granted by Bournemouth Council, and that houses could be built as little as 50 metres away from the SSSI, endangering rare reptiles. In 1991, then Secretary of State Michael Heseltine revoked planning consent for development on all of Canford Heath. In 2008, planning permission was given to develop homes on a former landfill site not in the SSSI, but plans were later abandoned. The former landfill site is now being restored to heathland.

In 2006, a heath fire started by arsonists caused around 100 people to be evacuated from their homes, and required around 170 firefighters to put out. Around 34–45 hectares of heathland burned.

In 2015, another fire spread over 2 ha of heathland, and required 70 firefighters; the damage caused could take 15–25 years for the heath to return to its former state.

On 23 April 2022, a large fire broke out on the heath, close to Mannings Heath roundabout. Twenty homes were evacuated, and an area of roughly 16.7 hectares was burnt. Dozens of animals were reported killed, and Dorset Wildlife Trust said that it would take 15 years for the heath to be restored. On 25 April, Dorset & Wiltshire Fire and Rescue Service investigators said that the fire was started deliberately. On 14 May yet another fire broke out on the heath. On 22 May, a third fire broke out. The fire service confirmed that it was once again due to "human intervention".

Heathland 
Canford Heath is Dorset's largest heathland, and much of it is a Site of Special Scientific Interest and part of the Dorset Heathlands Special Protection Area. Canford Heath is the largest lowland heath in the United Kingdom, and is home to many rare species, including the smooth snake, sand lizard and Dartford warbler. To maintain the heathland and its wildlife, a 10-year management plan was introduced in 2010. In 2009, an episode of Springwatch was filmed at Canford Heath's Hatchpond.

Geography
Canford Heath has grown its own community life with two public houses (The Haymoor and The Pilot), churches, an ASDA supermarket, five schools and a range of social activities for young people. The Tower Park leisure complex is nearby.

Schools

In September 2013, Poole Council changed its age of transfer, adopting the primary school system in favour of the previous middle school system. As such, all first and middle schools became infant and junior schools. There are two infant schools in Canford Heath (Ad Astra Infant School and Canford Heath Infant School), two junior schools (Haymoor Junior School and Canford Heath Junior School) and two secondary schools (Magna Academy and Poole Grammar School). Poole Grammar School is a selective all-male school. There is also a special educational needs school (Longspee School & Service).

Politics 
For the purpose of local elections, Canford Heath consisted of two wards, Canford Heath East and Canford Heath West, each of which elect two councillors. At the 2015 council election, Canford Heath East elected two Liberal Democrat councillors, and Canford Heath West elected two Conservative councillors.

Since 2019, the area has been part of the Canford Heath ward, which elects three councillors to Bournemouth, Christchurch and Poole Council.

Poole's mayor for the civic year 2018–19 was Cllr Sean Gabriel, representing the Canford Heath West Ward. 
For the purposes of national elections, since 1997 Canford Heath has been part of the Mid Dorset and North Poole constituency; previously it was part of the Poole constituency. The current MP is Michael Tomlinson, who won the seat in 2015.

References

External links

 Canford Heath Community
 Canford Heath Neighbourhood Watch

Sites of Special Scientific Interest in Dorset
Areas of Poole
Heaths of the United Kingdom